Alessandro Alessandroni (18 March 1925 – 26 March 2017) was an Italian musician and composer. He played multiple
instruments, including the guitar, mandolin, mandolincello, sitar, accordion and piano, and composed more than 40 film scores and countless library music.

Biography
Alessandroni collaborated with his childhood friend Ennio Morricone on a number of soundtracks for Spaghetti Westerns. Morricone's orchestration often calls for an unusual combination of instruments, voices, and whistling. Alessandroni's twangy guitar riff is central to the main theme for The Good, the Bad and the Ugly. Alessandroni can be heard as the whistler on the soundtracks for Sergio Leone's films, including A Fistful of Dollars, For a Few Dollars More, Once Upon a Time in the West, and Pervirella. He also collaborated with Morricone in scoring the 1974 film Around the World with Peynet's Lovers.

Alessandroni founded the octet vocal group  (English: The Modern Choristers) in 1961. The group, which included his wife, performed wordless vocals on several Italian movie soundtracks. Most notably, I Cantori Moderni are featured on the song "Mah Nà Mah Nà", written by Piero Umiliani for the 1968 Luigi Scattini mondo film Sweden: Heaven and Hell and popularized on The Muppet Show.

Alessandro has also composed film scores, including Any Gun Can Play (1967), The Reward's Yours... The Man's Mine (1969), Lady Frankenstein (1971),  The Devil's Nightmare (1971), The Mad Butcher (1971), Seven Hours of Violence (1973), Sinbad and the Caliph of Baghdad (1973), Poker in Bed (1974), White Fang and the Hunter (1975), Blood and Bullets (1976), L'adolescente (1976), La professoressa di scienze naturali (1976),  The Opening of Misty Beethoven (1976), Women's Camp 119 (1977), Killer Nun (1978), L'imbranato (1979), and Trinity Goes East (1998).

References

External links
 Official site
 

1925 births
2017 deaths
Musicians from Rome
Italian film score composers
Italian male film score composers
Whistlers
20th-century Italian composers
20th-century Italian male musicians